Hewitt & Emerson was an architectural firm based in Peoria, Illinois. Herbert Edmund Hewitt and Frank Nelson Emerson established their partnership in 1909. Richard Seaton Gregg became a partner in 1919, establishing Hewitt, Emerson & Gregg.

Emerson graduated from Princeton University and from the Massachusetts Institute of Technology, and studied also at the Ecole des Beaux Arts in Paris. Both Hewitt and Emerson were members of the American Institute of Architects, and were elected Fellow in 1932 and 1940, respectively.

The firm designed a number of works that are listed on the National Register of Historic Places.

Works include (with attribution):
Gamma Phi Beta Sorority House, 1110 W. Nevada, Urbana, Illinois (Hewitt, Emerson & Gregg), NRHP-listed 
Grand Army of the Republic Memorial Hall, 416 Hamilton Blvd., Peoria, Illinois (Hewitt & Emerson), NRHP-listed 
Health Education Building, 1611 4th St., Charleston, Illinois (Hewitt, Emerson & Greg), NRHP-listed
Carl Herget Mansion, 420 Washington St., Pekin, Illinois (Hewitt & Emerson), NRHP-listed
Kewanee Hotel, 125 N. Chestnut, Kewanee, Illinois (Hewitt & Emerson), NRHP-listed
Peoria Cordage Company rope mill building, SW Washington St., Peoria, Illinois (Hewitt & Emerson), NRHP-listed
Pere Marquette Hotel, 501 Main St., Peoria, Illinois (Horace Trumbauer with Hewitt & Emerson), NRHP-listed
John C. Proctor Recreation Center, 300 S. Allen St., Peoria, Illinois (Hewitt & Emerson), NRHP-listed
YWCA Building (Peoria, Illinois), 301 NE Jefferson, Peoria, Illinois (Hewitt, Emerson & Gregg), NRHP-listed

References

Architecture firms based in Illinois
Design companies established in 1909
1909 establishments in Illinois